The men's 89 kg (195.8 lbs) Light-Contact category at the W.A.K.O. World Championships 2007 in Belgrade was the third heaviest of the male Light-Contact tournaments falling between the cruiserweight and heavyweight division when compared to Low-Kick and K-1 weight classes.  There were seventeen men from two continents (Europe and Africa) taking part in the competition.  Each of the matches was three rounds of two minutes each and were fought under Light-Contact rules. 

Due to there being too few contestants for a thirty-two man tournament, fifteen of the fighters got a bye through to the second round.  The tournament winner the Russian Ildar Gabbasov who defeated the Britain's Gavin Williamson by unanimous decision in the final to claim the gold medal.  Semi finalists Yohann Lemair from France and Juso Prosic from Austria were rewarded with bronze medals.

Results

Key

See also
List of WAKO Amateur World Championships
List of WAKO Amateur European Championships
List of male kickboxers

References

External links
 WAKO World Association of Kickboxing Organizations Official Site

Kickboxing events at the WAKO World Championships 2007 Belgrade
2007 in kickboxing
Kickboxing in Serbia